Ri Thong-il (born 20 November 1992) is a North Korean footballer who plays as a defender for Kigwancha and the North Korea national team.

Career
Ri was included in North Korea's squad for the 2019 AFC Asian Cup in the United Arab Emirates.

Career statistics

International

References

External links
 
 
 
 Ri Tong-il at DPRKFootball

1992 births
Living people
North Korean footballers
North Korea international footballers
Association football defenders
2019 AFC Asian Cup players